St Endellion is a civil parish and hamlet in north Cornwall, England, United Kingdom. The hamlet and parish church are situated four miles (6.5 km) north of Wadebridge.

The parish takes its name from Saint Endelienta, who is said to have evangelised the district in the fifth century and to have been one of the children of King Brychan. Two wells near the church are named after her.
The name is included in the electoral ward of St Minver and St Endellion, which includes Polzeath and Rock, with a population at the 2011 census of 3268.

Geography and topography 

St Endellion is the Type Locality for the minerals Bournonite (also known as Endellione or Endellionite) and Barstowite. 

St Endellion lies within the Cornwall Area of Outstanding Natural Beauty (AONB). Almost a third of Cornwall has AONB designation, with the same status and protection as a National Park.

The houses at Roscarrock and Tresungers are listed buildings: at Roscarrock part of the medieval house remains (it is Listed Grade I); Tresungers farmhouse was built in the late 16th century. The Roscarrock family included Nicholas Roscarrock.

Parish church 

 
The collegiate Church of England parish church of St Endelienta stands beside the road to Wadebridge and is a large building of the 15th century in Perpendicular style. It contains some fine examples of carving in stone and wood.

The earliest record of the church is in 1260, and in 1288 it is recorded as a collegiate church with four prebends. One of the prebends to which was attached the cure of souls came to be entitled to the rectory. It somehow escaped abolition in 1545 (when only the rector was resident) and continues to the present day: one of the prebendaries is the Rector, and the others usually incumbents of nearby parishes. The prebend of Marnay's or St Elen's is usually held by the incumbent of Lanhydrock. A new ecclesiastical parish of Port Isaac was created out of the parish in 1913 and one of the prebends became the endowment of that benefice, whose incumbent was a vicar.  In 1929, Walter Frere, Bishop of Truro, revived the collegiate foundation with new statutes, such that the holder of the Rectoral prebend would be resident and paid; while the other three prebends would be honorific, but with spiritual obligations in regularly supporting their co-prebends in prayer, and in meeting in an annual chapter. Consequently, St Endellion remains as one of only three non-academic medieval collegiate foundations in England to continue as an active college - the others being Westminster Abbey, and St George's Chapel, Windsor Castle.  The church was designated as Grade I listed in 1969.

There was previously a chapel located at Roscarrock, but this was in ruins by 1814.

While the actual date of foundation of the church is unknown legend tells that St Endelienta, when she was dying, asked her friends to have her body placed on a sledge pulled by bullocks (or calves) and to be buried where they stopped, that being the very spot where the church now stands.

Annual events 
Music festivals are held at Easter and at the end of July: they have been held in the summer since 1959 and at Easter since 1974. Some of the musicians involved formed the Endellion Quartet.

Notable people 
Florence Cameron: on 25 August 2010 it was announced that the British Prime Minister, David Cameron and his wife Samantha had named their newborn daughter "Florence Rose Endellion" after the village, reflecting the fact she was born while the Cameron family were holidaying in Cornwall.
Dr Rowan Williams, the former archbishop of Canterbury, was installed as a prebendary at St Endellion Church by the Bishop of Truro, the Right Reverend Tim Thornton, in 2014.
Luigi Pietro Fortunato Josa, one time archdeacon of Georgetown (British Guiana), served as rector here in 1917–22. Luigi came from an elite Vatican family and served for many years in British Guiana as 'Missionary to the Coolies', he spoke some South Asian and Chinese languages and published one of the first manuals on Hindi language study.

Brands
St. Endellion is a brie style cheese, made at the hamlet of Trevarrian near Newquay, cream enriched and hand-made using only Cornish milk and cream. The cheese is made by Cornish Country Larder, a firm founded by John Gaylard in the mid-1990s and still a family-run concern. The cheese has won many notable awards.

The Endellion Quartet was a string quartet musical ensemble.

See also

Trelights

References

Further reading
 Maclean, John (1872–79) The Parochial and Family History of the Deanery of Trigg Minor. 3 vols. London: Nichols & Son

External links

Hamlets in Cornwall
Civil parishes in Cornwall
Burial sites of the Children of Brychan